Paul Piaget Ducurroy (5 September 1934 – 1985) was a Spanish actor. He began his career as the stuntman of Charlton Heston in the film El Cid (1961). He has worked in a dozen of films, specializing in the western.

His daughter is the actress and model Cristina Piaget.

Filmography
 El día de los enamorados (1959) as Repartidor
 Zorro the Avenger (1962) as Charlie
 Shades of Zorro (1962) as Dan
 Implacable Three (1963) as João Silveira
 Four Bullets for Joe (1964) as Frank Dalton
 Black Angel of the Mississippi (1964) as Cowboy
 Hour of Death (1964) as Bob Carey
 Assault on Fort Texan (1965) as Major Sam Allison (final film role)

References

External links
 

1934 births
1985 deaths
People from Jerez de la Frontera
Spanish male film actors